Earl of Eldon was launched at Whitby in 1830 but registered in London. Her master was Captain E. Theaker and her owner was J. Barry. She first appeared in Lloyd's Register in 1830; in 1831 her trade was London-India.

Loss
Earl of Eldon departed Bombay on 24 August 1834, bound for London with many passengers and a cargo of cotton. Her cargo had been loaded into the ship's hold in a damp condition. What one passenger some time later believed was steam billowing from the hold turned out to be smoke. Within the hour, the deck was ablaze and by mid-afternoon, the entire vessel was in flames. Forty-five men, women and children and the crew took to three ship's boats to make their escape. After they had rowed for an hour, Earl of Eldons powder-magazine exploded, causing the ship to disintegrate spectacularly.

On 10 October, after 13 days and a voyage of 450 miles at sea in open boats, all 45, including four women and an infant, arrived safely at Rodrigues. Lloyd's List reported on 20 January 1835 that Earl of Eldon had burnt at sea.

Citations and references
Citations

References

 
  

1830 ships
Ships built in Whitby
Age of Sail merchant ships
Merchant ships of the United Kingdom
Maritime incidents in September 1834